Aquaveo is a modeling software company based in Provo, Utah that develops software used to model and simulate groundwater, watershed, and surface water resources. Its main software products include SMS, GMS, WMS, and Arc Hydro Groundwater.

History
The Engineering Computer Graphics Laboratory (ECGL) was established in 1985 at Brigham Young University (BYU). Simulation data produced in the lab was critical to Anderson v. Cryovac, Inc., a 1986 federal lawsuit concerning toxic contamination of groundwater in Woburn, Massachusetts. After using another BYU product—Movie BYU—to animate a hydrology problem to make it easier to understand, Norm Jones decided to start work on software that helped engineers visualize problems and solutions. Use of the tools created by Jones allowed the U.S. Army Corps of Engineers to save "hundreds of thousands of dollars".

Alan Zundel and James Nelson, two other professors at BYU, also became involved in the process of developing the software in 1991. By 2002, the company's software was being used in "more than 100 countries and [by] more than 9,000 organizations." Royd Nelson created Environmental Modeling Systems (EMSI), a private company, in October 1995 to distribute the software created in the ECGL. The name of the lab was changed in September 1998 to the Environmental Modeling Research Laboratory (EMRL).

The government of India used early versions of the software developed by the EMRL to help with finding sources of clean groundwater, setting groundwater policy, and setting a course of action to clean up the contaminated groundwater in their country. State and local governments in Utah and California have used the software to help trace contaminant sources at farms and mining facilities, and to determine how to manage water resources in drier climates like the Los Angeles area.

The planners of the 2002 Winter Olympics, held in Salt Lake City, Utah, used the Watershed Modeling System (WMS) software to simulate terrorist attacks on water infrastructure such as the Jordanelle Reservoir. In April 2007, a private company named Aquaveo was created to develop the work of the EMRL as commercial products, and the main people at the lab moved to the new company. EMSI and Aquaveo merged in October 2008, keeping the company name of "Aquaveo".

Local and federal government agencies, including the US Army Corps of Engineers, the US Federal Highway Administration, Los Angeles County, the USGS, the US Department of Energy, and the USEPA, have software and consulting contracts with Aquaveo. In 2011, the government of Australia used Arc Hydro Groundwater to help in developing a national groundwater information system. Arc Hydro was used to convert bore and construction log data and to create geovolumes from georasters.

Aquaveo worked with the Office of Naval Research, the Carderock Division of the Naval Surface Warfare Center, and several universities and companies to create the Environmental and Ship Motion Forecasting system. This system was designed to "provide sea-based forces with new capabilities for difficult operations like ship-to-ship transfer of personnel, vehicles or material-giving operators sea condition information at levels of accuracy never possible before".

Products
Aquaveo is primarily a software development company for water modeling that allow water to be modeled in most situations: watershed, rivers, lakes, ocean tides, flooding, and so on. Its flagship products are SMS and GMS, which are used by municipalities and universities around the world. It also produces WMS and Arc Hydro Groundwater. Their software is used by "over 12,000 firms, government institutions, and universities in over 120 countries".

Arc Hydro Groundwater
Arc Hydro Groundwater allows for managing groundwater and subsurface data within ArcGIS. The software was created in cooperation with ESRI to allow groundwater and subsurface analysis, as well as using MODFLOW to analyze results.

CityWater
CityWater is a cloud-based water distribution management tool. It uses EPANET model files to allow users via any modern browser to access current information on a water distribution system such as a municipal water system.

GMS

The Groundwater Modeling System (GMS) is a computer application designed to build and simulate groundwater models. It uses 2D and 3D geostatistics and stratigraphic modeling to show how water and contaminants can move through various soil structures. The software supports many standard models, including MODFLOW, MODPATH, MT3DMS, RT3D, FEMWATER, SEEP2D, and UTEXAS.

SMS

The Surface-water Modeling System (SMS) is an application used for building and simulating surface water models within the hydrological cycle, including river and stream flow models, flooding, and sediment and particle flow in lakes and oceans. It features 1D and 2D conceptual modeling. The software supports standard models, including ADCIRC, CMS-FLOW2D, FESWMS, TABS, TUFLOW, BOUSS-2D, CGWAVE, STWAVE, CMS-WAVE (WABED), GENESIS, and PTM.

WMS

The Watershed Modeling System (WMS) is an application used for developing watershed simulations of river hydraulics, municipal storm drain systems, floodplains, and watersheds. WMS supports lumped parameter, regression, and 2D hydrologic modeling of watersheds, and can be used to model both water quantity and water quality. It supports standard models such as HEC-1, HEC-RAS, HEC-HMS, TR-20, TR-55 hydrologic model, National Flood Frequency Model, rational hydrologic model, MODRAT, HSPF, CE-QUAL-W2, GSSHA, and SMPDBK.

XMDF

XMDF (eXtensible Model Data Format) is a library providing a standard format for the geometric data storage of river cross-sections, 2D/3D structured and unstructured meshes, geometric paths through space, and associated time data. XMDF uses HDF5 for cross-platform data storage and compression. API includes interfaces for C/C++ and Fortran.

Associations
Aquaveo is a member of the American Water Resources Association.

References

Companies based in Provo, Utah
Engineering companies of the United States
Environmental research
Hydrology and urban planning
Software companies based in Utah
Water resource management in the United States
2007 establishments in Utah
Software companies of the United States